Humphrey, 2nd Earl of Buckingham (1381 – September 2, 1399) was an English peer and member of the House of Lords.

He was Lord High Constable of England. His father, Thomas of Woodstock, was the youngest son of King Edward III and 1st cousin of Richard II.

After the murder of his father, he became the ward of the crown, along with Henry of Monmouth (the future King Henry V), eldest son and heir of Henry Bolingbroke (the future King Henry IV). Richard II took both boys with him to Ireland in 1398, where they were left in custody at Kells, when Richard returned to face Bolingbroke. Once Richard II had been deposed, Henry Bolingbroke ordered their release and summoned them home but Humphrey, who was sickly, died on the way on September 2, 1399. His mother Eleanor de Bohun died shortly after, allegedly because of her sorrow after the loss of her son.

References

02
1399 deaths
Humphrey, 2nd Earl of Buckingham
1381 births